Thrissur Diocese is one of the 30 dioceses of the Malankara Orthodox Syrian Church with its headquarters at Mannuthy, Kerala.

History 

The diocese was formed in 1982 with parishes in Thrissur and Palakkad districts. At the time of the formation of the diocese there were 32 parishes and 26 priests. The present diocesan headquarters was completed in 1995.

Institutions and mission
The diocese has one Upper Primary School  in Palakkadu district and a Study center, near Thrissur. The diocese runs a community development project called "Anveshi, Thrissru" which helps people to help themselves. The diocese has a mission in Burbank, near Los Angeles, CA in USA with 300+ families of Mediterranean region origin. For the last several years the diocese has been in continuous struggle to make the unity of the Church a reality.

Headquarters
The headquarters of the diocese is at Mannuthy. Address: Gedseemon Orthodox Bishop's House, Mannuthy, Thrissur, Kerala, INDIA. 680651. Tel. +4872371039. The house was built by help from people of the Church at various parts of the world under the leadership of Metropolitan Yuhanon Mar Meletius. A small parish worships in the chapel in the diocesan headquarters. Due to lack of space a new plot was purchased adjacent to the headquarters building and a new chapel is constructed. The chapel is named "St. Mary's Unity Chapel". It symbolizes the Church unity efforts of the diocese.

PARISH LIST 

1) Alaikalkulambu St.Marys Orthodox Church

2) Chalishery St.Peters and St.Pauls Orthodox Church

3) Cherukunnam St.Thomas Orthodox Church
 
4) Chuvanammanu St.George Orthodox Church
 
5) Elanadu St.Marys Orthodox Church
 
6) Erukumchira St.Marys Orthodox Church
 
7) Kakkanikkadu St.George Orthodox Church
 
8) Kakkanikkadu St.Gregorios Orthodox Church
 
9) Kallampara St.Marys Orthodox Church
 
10) Kannara St.Marys Orthodox Church
 
11) Katilapoovam St.Marys Orthodox Church
 
12) Kairady St.Marys Orthodox Church
 
13) Kodaly St.George Orthodox Church
 
14) Kombzha Mar Gregorios Orthodox Church
 
15) Mambra St.Kuriakose Orthodox Church
 
16) Mangalamdam St.Marys Orthodox Church
 
17) Mannuthy St.Marys Orthodox Church
 
18) Marmcode St.George Orthodox Church
 
19) Maorotichal St.George Orthodox Church
 
20) Nelleppally St.Johns Orthodox Church
 
21) Paithala Mar Gregorios Orthodox Church
 
22) Pazhayannoor Eldho Mar Baselios Orthodox Church
 
23) Pazhayannoor St.Marys Orthodox Church
 
24) Pazhayannoorpadam St.Johns Orthodox Church
 
25) Peechy St.George Orthodox Church
 
26) Pulakodu St.Marys Orthodox Church
 
27) Thenidukku St.George Orthodox Church
 
28) Thrikanaya St.George Orthodox Church
 
29) Valkulambu Mar Gregorios Orthodox Church
 
30) Valkulambu St.Thomas Orthodox Church
 
31) Vattai St.Marys Orthodox Church
 
32) Vatuly St.George Orthodox Church
 
33) Vellikulangara St.Marys Orthodox Church
 
34) DesertLand St.Dinysious Orthodox Church

35) DesertLand St.George Orthodox Church

36) DesertLand St.Gregorios Orthodox Church
 
37) ##Kaimoor St.George Orthodox Church
 
38) ##Olavakodu St.Peters Orthodox Church
 
39) ##Karimba St.George Orthodox Church
 
40) ##Vellapadom St.George Orthodox Church

41) ## Chelakkara St.George Orthodox puthenpali

References

Malankara Orthodox Syrian Church dioceses
1982 establishments in Kerala